Dmitri Varfolomeyev may refer to:

 Dmitri Varfolomeyev (footballer, born 1978), Russian football player
 Dmitri Varfolomeyev (footballer, born 1993), Russian football player